Franklin Scott Charles (born February 23, 1969) is a former professional baseball catcher. He played part of one season in Major League Baseball for the Houston Astros in 2000.

Amateur career
A native of Fontana, California, Charles attended Montclair College Preparatory School and Cal State Fullerton. In 1989 and 1990, he played collegiate summer baseball with the Brewster Whitecaps of the Cape Cod Baseball League. He was selected by the San Francisco Giants in the 17th round of the 1991 amateur entry draft.

Professional career
In March 1994 he was purchased by the Rangers from the St. Paul Saints of the Northern League. In March 1998 he was signed as free agent by the Giants, and in December 1998 by the Padres. In January 1999 he was signed as free agent by the Astros. In 2000, he played four games for the Houston Astros, batting .429 in seven at bats. Over 14 minor league seasons, Charles batted .273.

Personal
Charles is Jewish.

References

External links
, or Retrosheet, or Pura Pelota (Venezuelan Winter League)

1969 births
Living people
Baseball players from California
Brewster Whitecaps players
Cal State Fullerton Titans baseball players
California State University, Fullerton alumni
Charlotte Rangers players
Clinton Giants players
Everett Giants players
Fresno Grizzlies players
Houston Astros players
Jewish American baseball players
Jewish Major League Baseball players
Las Vegas Stars (baseball) players
Major League Baseball catchers
New Orleans Zephyrs players
North Shore Spirit players
Oklahoma City 89ers players
Pawtucket Red Sox players
People from Fontana, California
Rochester Red Wings players
San Jose Giants players
Shreveport Captains players
St. Paul Saints players
Tiburones de La Guaira players
American expatriate baseball players in Venezuela
Tulsa Drillers players
21st-century American Jews
Montclair College Preparatory School alumni